Graveship was a subdivision of a medieval estate each was under a grave who was selected every year. An example is the manor of Wakefield, which was managed with 12 graveships. The OED defines a graveship as: "In the West Riding of Yorkshire: a district, in some instances a subdivision of a large parish, in others comprising a number of parishes; so called as having formerly been administered by a grave or a body of graves."

Grave
The term has ancient origins, Morehouse in "The History and Topography of the Parish of Kirkburton and of the Graveship of Holme" defines Grave (prepositus in Latin deeds) as probably derived from the Anglo-Saxon Lenere or the German Graf (Middle-German grave) and in that sense means an officer, whose duty it was to collect the lord’s rents and/or execute administrative orders in the graveship. In most of England, the official would have been termed a reeve but in the manor of Wakefield, he was termed a grave and was selected at the Michaelmas Great Court Leet by four sworn men of the graveship, at which point either the grave or a designated deputy took an oath of service.

List of Graveships of the Manor of Wakefield
 Alverthorpe
 Hipperholme
 Holme
 Horbury
 Ossett
 Rastrick
 Sandal
 Scammonden
 Sowerby
 Stanley
 Thornes
 Wakefield

List of other Graveships
 Howgrave

See also
 Reeve

Notes, citations, and references

Notes

Citations

References
 'graveship' Yorkshire Historical Dictionary. Accessed 12-4-2020.
 
 Map of Wakefield Manor in Wakefield Manor Court Rolls, v.1 p. 26
 
 

Medieval England
Anglo-Saxon England